Francesco Aglietti (1 November 1757 Brescia – 3 May 1836 Venezia) was an Italian physician and writer.

Aglietti was the second President of the Ateneo Veneto di Lettere Scienze ed Arti.

With Antonio Gualandris and Stefano Gallino, in 1793 he founded Il Giornale per servire alla storia ragionata della medicina di questo secolo. Upon his death, his library included 10,000 volumes.

Works
 Sulla litiasi delle arterie (1800)
 Delle lodi (1836)

References

1757 births
1836 deaths
18th-century Italian physicians
Italian male writers
Members of the Göttingen Academy of Sciences and Humanities